The following is a list of massacres that have occurred in East Timor (numbers may be approximate):

External links 
 07.2 Unlawful Killings and Enforced Disappearances from final report "Chega!" of Commission for Reception, Truth and Reconciliation in East Timor (CAVR)

East Timor
Massacres